Igor Lichnovsky Osorio (born 7 March 1994) is a Chilean professional footballer who plays for Liga MX club Tigres UANL and the Chile national team as a central defender.

Club career

Universidad
Born in Peñaflor near Santiago to an Austrian father of German and Slovak descent, Lichnovsky joined Club Universidad de Chile at the age of 8. On 20 November 2011 he first appeared in the Campeonato Nacional, playing the full 90 minutes in a 0–0 home draw against Club Deportivo Universidad Católica for the Clausura in which he was also voted as Player of the match.

Lichnovsky scored his first goal as a professional on 29 April 2012, contributing to a 5–0 derby home win over Colo-Colo.

Porto
Lichnovsky's good performances for both Universidad and the Chilean national youth teams attracted interest from English club Chelsea. However, nothing came of it, and in late June 2014 he signed a four-year contract with FC Porto from Portugal, being initially assigned to the B team.

Lichnovsky played his first competitive match on 17 October 2015, in a 2–0 win at Varzim S.C. in the third round of the Taça de Portugal. On 22 January of the following year he was loaned to Sporting de Gijón until June, making his La Liga debut on 17 February by featuring the entire 1–3 home loss against FC Barcelona.

Lichnovsky returned to Spain on 2 August 2016, joining Segunda División team Real Valladolid on another loan, and scored his first goal in the country on 3 September when he opened a 2–1 home victory over Girona FC in the third minute.

Mexico
On 21 June 2017, Lichnovsky moved to the third continent of his career by joining Club Necaxa. He made his Liga MX debut on 24 July in a 2–0 win at C.D. Veracruz, and was ever-present over the season for the team from Aguascalientes City.

Lichnovsky transferred to Cruz Azul of the same league in May 2018. He scored his first goal in Mexican football the following 31 March, to secure a 2–2 draw away to CF Monterrey.

Al Shabab
On 10 October 2020, Lichnovsky signed with Al Shabab FC of the Saudi Professional League.

International career
Lichnovsky was capped by Chile at under-17 and under-20 levels. He participated with the latter in the 2013 South American Youth Championship, helping his team qualify to the 2013 FIFA World Cup in Turkey whilst acting as captain in both tournaments.

Lichnovsky made his debut with the full side on 14 November 2014, playing the entire 5–0 friendly win with Venezuela at the Estadio CAP in Talcahuano. He did not make his second appearance until 27 March 2018, in a goalless exhibition away to Denmark.

Manager Reinaldo Rueda called Lichnovsky up for the 2019 Copa América in Brazil. He played one match as a substitute for his competitive debut for the fourth-place finishers, as a 55th-minute replacement for Gary Medel in a 1–0 group loss against Uruguay in the Maracanã Stadium.

Honours
Universidad de Chile
Chilean Primera División: Clausura 2011, Apertura 2012
Copa Chile: 2012–13
Copa Sudamericana: 2011

Necaxa
Copa MX: Clausura 2018

Cruz Azul
Copa MX: Apertura 2018
Supercopa MX: 2019
Leagues Cup: 2019

References

External links

1994 births
Living people
Chilean people of Austrian descent
Chilean people of Slovak descent
Chilean footballers
Footballers from Santiago
Association football defenders
Chilean Primera División players
Universidad de Chile footballers
Liga Portugal 2 players
FC Porto B players
FC Porto players
La Liga players
Segunda División players
Sporting de Gijón players
Real Valladolid players
Liga MX players
Club Necaxa footballers
Cruz Azul footballers
Tigres UANL footballers
Saudi Professional League players
Al-Shabab FC (Riyadh) players
Chile under-20 international footballers
Chile international footballers
2019 Copa América players
Chilean expatriate footballers
Expatriate footballers in Portugal
Expatriate footballers in Spain
Expatriate footballers in Mexico
Expatriate footballers in Saudi Arabia
Chilean expatriate sportspeople in Portugal
Chilean expatriate sportspeople in Spain
Chilean expatriate sportspeople in Mexico
Chilean expatriate sportspeople in Saudi Arabia